Puumalainen is a Finnish surname. Notable people with the surname include:

 Ville Puumalainen (1900–1962), Finnish bricklayer and politician
 Tiina Puumalainen (born 1966), Finnish theatre director and a playwright

Finnish-language surnames
Surnames of Finnish origin